Eastern or Bie Pish Gilaki is a dialect of the Gilaki language spoken in the eastern portion of Gilan and western Mazandaran, Iran.

References

Northwestern Iranian languages